British–Romanian relations are bilateral foreign relations between United Kingdom and Romania. Both countries established diplomatic relations in 1880.  Both countries are members of NATO.  The United Kingdom has an embassy in Bucharest and Romania has an embassy in London. Romania also has two consulates general in Edinburgh and Manchester. Romania also has five honorary consulates based in Leeds, Newcastle, Inverness, Liverpool and Bristol. Romania has a cultural institute in London.

History
 
In 1588, Petru Șchiopul, the Prince of Moldavia, concluded a trade treaty with Elizabeth I of England. Through the treaty, English merchants were allowed to conduct free trade in the country while paying only a 3% customs tax on the value of goods, as opposed to the 12% tax imposed on other merchants.

At the Congress of Berlin 1877 to 1878, Great Britain worked to assist Romania's goal of breaking away from the Ottoman Empire. The British and Russian delegations negotiated a deal whereby Romania obtained its independence, with conditions. While Britain was unable to gain all that it wanted, it did manage to prevent Russian expansion into the Mediterranean. The result was  good  relations between Britain and Romania. 

In recent years relations between Britain and Romania have soured due to what some hold to be xenophobic reports in the British press.

Companies
Royal Bank of Scotland operated in Romania between 15 October 2008 and 31 December 2015.

The Romanian subsidiary of the British company Vodafone is the second largest mobile network operator in the country.

One of the best known Romanian brands in the United Kingdom is Dacia. It has a wide spread network of dealers throughout the country.

See also
 Foreign relations of Romania
 Foreign relations of United Kingdom
 Romanian migration to the United Kingdom
 Britishs in Romania
 British Romanian Educational Exchange
 Anglican Church, Bucharest
 United Kingdom–European Union relations

References

External links
  British Foreign and Commonwealth Office about relations with Romania
  British embassy in Bucharest
  Romanian embassy in London